The 2021 Kansas City, Kansas mayoral election was held on November 2, 2021 for the office of Mayor/CEO of the United Government of Wyandotte County and Kansas City, Kansas. The election was officially nonpartisan, with a primary being held on August 3, 2021. Incumbent David Alvey and Tyrone Garner took the top two spots in the primary election and were on ballot in the general election. Garner defeated Alvey, becoming the first African-American mayor of Kansas City.

Primary election

Candidates
The following people filed for candidacy and were on the ballot for the primary election. 
David Alvey, incumbent mayor
Daren Duffy
Tyrone Garner, U.S. Army veteran and former KCKPD deputy chief
Chris Steineger, former United Government District 6 senator
Janice (Grant) Witt, CEO of Reola Grant Center

Results
Tyrone Garner and David Alvey received enough votes to move on to the general election in November.

General election
The general election took place on November 2, 2021.

Notes

References

Kansas City, Kansas mayoral
Kansas City, Kansas
Mayoral elections in Kansas City, Kansas